The 2016 Penn Quakers football team represented the University of Pennsylvania during the 2016 NCAA Division I FCS football season. They were led by second year head coach Ray Priore and played their home games at Franklin Field. They are a member of the Ivy League. Penn finished the season 7–3 overall and 6–1 in Ivy League play to tie with Princeton for the Ivy League title. Penn averaged 5,589 fans per game.

Schedule

Roster

Ranking movements

References

Penn
Penn Quakers football seasons
Ivy League football champion seasons
Penn Quakers football